Handball at the 2021 Summer Deaflympics  will held in Caxias Do Sul, Brazil from 2 to 14 May 2022.

Medal summary

Medalists

Men's competition

Group stage

Pool A

Pool B

Knockout stage

Classification

Women's competition

Group stage

Pool A

Knockout stage

References

External links
 Deaflympics 2021

2021 Summer Deaflympics
2022 in handball
International handball competitions hosted by Brazil